This is a list of ecoregions in Ecuador.

Terrestrial
Ecuador is in the Neotropical realm. Ecoregions are listed by biome.

Tropical and subtropical moist broadleaf forests
 Chocó–Darién moist forests
 Eastern Cordillera Real montane forests
 Napo moist forests
 Northwestern Andean montane forests
 Western Ecuador moist forests

Tropical and subtropical dry broadleaf forests
 Ecuadorian dry forests
 Tumbes–Piura dry forests

Flooded grasslands and savannas
 Guayaquil flooded grasslands

Montane grasslands and shrublands
 Cordillera Central páramo
 Northern Andean páramo

Deserts and xeric shrublands
 Galápagos Islands xeric scrub

Mangroves
 Esmeraldas–Pacific Colombia mangroves
 Gulf of Guayaquil–Tumbes mangroves
 Manabí mangroves

Marine

Tropical Eastern Pacific
 Galapagos
 Guayaquil
 Panama Bight

References

 
ecoregions
Ecuador